This is a list of notable women mass spectrometrists with significant scientific contribution towards advancement in theories, instrumentation and applications of mass spectrometry. The list is organized by the chemical societies and their major awards related to mass spectrometry, as well as presidency.

American Chemical Society 
The Frank H. Field and Joe L. Franklin Award for Outstanding Achievement in Mass Spectrometry is the major mass spectrometry award offered by the American Chemical Society.

Frank H. Field and Joe L. Franklin Award for Outstanding Achievement in Mass Spectrometry (since 1985) 

 2021 Veronica M. Bierbaum
 2020 Kimberly A. Prather
 2019 Jennifer S. Brodbelt
 2018 Carol Vivien Robinson
 2017 Vicki H. Wysocki
 2015 Hilkka I. Kenttämaa
 2010 Catherine E. Costello
 2008 Catherine C. Fenselau
 1990 Marjorie G. Horning

American Society for Mass Spectrometry 
The major awards from the American Society for Mass Spectrometry are John B. Fenn Award for a Distinguished Contribution in Mass Spectrometry, Biemann Medal, Research Award, Research at Primarily Undergraduate Institutions (PUIs) Award, and Al Yergey Mass Spectrometry Scientist Award. A number of notable women mass spectrometrists served as presidents of the American Society for Mass Spectrometry.

John B. Fenn Award for a Distinguished Contribution in Mass Spectrometry (since 1990) 

 2023 Carol Vivien Robinson
 2017 Catherine E. Costello
 2012 Catherine C. Fenselau
 2009 Vicki H. Wysocki

Biemann Medal (since 1997) 

 2022 Erin S. Baker
 2020 Ying Ge
 2019 Sarah Trimpin
 2016 Kristina Håkansson
 2014 Lingjun Li
 2008 Julia Laskin
 2000 Julie A. Leary

Research Award (since 1986) 

 2023 Kelly Marie Hines and Stacy Malaker
 2022 Gloria Sheynkman
 2021 Xin Yan
 2019 Eleanor Browne
 2014 Kerri A. Pratt
 2013 Yu Xia
 2012 Ileana M. Cristea and Sharon J. Pitteri
 2011 Judit Villen
 2010 Sarah Trimpin 
 2007 Rebecca Jockusch
 2006 Heather Desaire
 2005 Kristina Hăkansson
 2004 Lingjun Li
 2003 Andrea Grottoli 
 2001 Deborah S. Gross
 2000 Elaine Marzluff
 1998 Mary T. Rodgers
 1997 M. Judith Charles
 1994 Kimberly A. Prather
 1993 Susan Graul
 1992 Vicki H. Wysocki
 1991 Hilkka I. Kenttämaa 
 1990 Jennifer Brodbelt
 1987 Susan Olesik

Research at Primarily Undergraduate Institutions (PUIs) Award (since 2019) 

 2023 Erica Jacobs
 2021 Christine Hughey
 2019 Callie Cole

Al Yergey Mass Spectrometry Scientist Award (since 2019) 

 2023 Amina Woods 
 2022 Martha M. Vestling
 2020 Rachel Ogorzalek Loo

President and Past Presidents (since 1953) 

 2022–2024 Julia Laskin
 2020–2022 Susan Richardson
 2016–2018 Vicki Wysocki
 2014–2016 Jennifer Brodbelt
 2012–2014 Susan Weintraub
 2006–2008 Barbara S. Larsen
 2002–2004 Catherine E. Costello
 1996–1998 Veronica M. Bierbaum
 1982–1984 Catherine Fenselau

International Mass Spectrometry Foundation 
The major awards from the International Mass Spectrometry Foundation are the Thomson Medal Award and the Curt Brunnée Award.

Thomson Medal Award (since 1985) 

 2022 Vicki Wysocki and Lidia Gall
 2020 Alison E. Ashcroft
 2014 Carol V. Robinson
 2009 Catherine E. Costello and Catherine. C. Fenselau

Curt Brunnée Award (since 1994) 

 2022 Erin S. Baker

Australian and New Zealand Society for Mass Spectrometry 
The major awards from the Australian and New Zealand Society for Mass Spectrometry (ANZSMS) are the ANZSMS Medal, Morrison Medal, Bowel Medal, Michael Guilhaus Research Award and ANZSMS Fellows.

ANZSMS Medal (since 2009) 

 The award has not been given to a female mass spectrometrist since award inception in 2009.

Morrison Medal (since 1990) 

 2017 Kliti Grice
 2003 Margaret Sheil

Bowie Medal (since 2009) 

 2021 Michelle Colgrave
 2017 Tara Pukala

Michael Guilhaus Research Award (since 2015) 

 The award has not been given to a female mass spectrometrist since award inception in 2015.

ANZSMS Fellows (since 2014) 

 2014 Margaret Sheil

Brazilian Society of Mass Spectrometry 
The major award of the Brazilian Society of Mass Spectrometry is the BrMASS Manuel Riveros Medal.

BrMASS Manuel Riveros Medal 

 2022 Lidija Nikolaevna Gall, Julia Laskin, Claudia Moraes de Rezende, Rosa Erra-Balsells
 2022 Julia Laskin
 2022 Claudia Moraes de Rezende
 2022 Rosa Erra-Balsells
 Maria Fernanda Georgina Gine Rosias
 Conchetta Cacheres

British Mass Spectrometry Society 
The major awards of the British Mass Spectrometry Society (BMSS) are the Aston Medal and the BMSS Medal.

Aston Medal (since 1987) 

 2011 Carol V. Robinson

BMSS Medal (since 2002) 

 2019 Alison Ashcroft

Canadian Society for Mass Spectrometry 
The major award of the Canadian Society for Mass Spectrometry is the Fred P. Lossing Award.

Fred P. Lossing Award (since 1994) 

 2018 Ann English
 2017 Helene Perreault

German Mass Spectrometry Society (Deutsche Gesellschaft für Massenspektrometrie, DGMS) 
The major awards of the German Mass Spectrometry Society (Deutsche Gesellschaft für Massenspektrometrie, DGMS) are the Mattauch-Herzog Award for Mass Spectrometry, Wolfgang Paul Lecture, Mass Spectrometry in the Life Sciences Award, and Life Science Prize.

Mattauch-Herzog Award for Mass Spectrometry (since 1988) 

 2022 Charlotte Uetrecht
 2004 Andrea Sinz

Wolfgang Paul Lecture (since 1997) 

 2019 Vicki Wysocki
 2015 Catherine E. Costello
 1998 Chava Lifshitz

Mass Spectrometry in the Life Sciences Award (since 2009) 

 2022 Andrea Sinz
 2018 Michal Sharon
 2015 Jana Seifert
 2009 J. Sabine Becker

Life Science Prize (2002–2007) 

 2002 Jasna Peter-Katalinic

Swiss Group for Mass Spectrometry 
The major award of the Swiss Group for Mass Spectrometry (SGMS) is the SGMS Award.

SGMS Award (since 2014) 

 2016 Paola Picotti

Taiwan Society for Mass Spectrometry 
The major awards of the Taiwan Society for Mass Spectrometry include the Taiwan Society for Mass Spectrometry Medal and the Outstanding Scholar Research Award.

Taiwan Society for Mass Spectrometry Medal (since 2017) 

 2020 Yu-Ju Chen 陳玉如

Outstanding Scholar Research Award (since 2011) 

 2018 Shu-Hui Chen 陳淑慧
 2012 Mei-Chun Tseng 曾美郡
 2011 Yu-Ju Chen 陳玉如

Canadian National Proteomics Network 
The major awards of the Canadian National Proteomics Network (CNPN) are the CNPN-Tony Pawson Proteomics Award, and the New Investigator Award.

CNPN-Tony Pawson Proteomics Award (since 2010) 

 2020 Anne-Claude Gingras
 2019 Jennifer Van Eyk

New Investigator Award (since 2020) 

 The award has not been given to a female mass spectrometrist since the award inception in 2020.

Human Proteome Organization 
The major awards of the Human Proteome Organization are the Distinguished Achievement in Proteomic Sciences Award, Discovery in Proteomic Sciences Award, Clinical & Translational Proteomics Award, Science & Technology Award, and Distinguished Service Award.

Distinguished Achievement in Proteomic Sciences Award (since 2004) 

 2021 Nicolle H. Packer
 2020 Karin Rodland
 2019 Jennifer Van Eyk
 2018 Kathryn K. Lilley
 2015 Amanda Paulovich
 2012 Carol Robinson
 2004 Angelika Gorg

Discovery in Proteomic Sciences Award (since 2007) 

 2021 Paola Picotti
 2019 Anne-Claude Gingras
 2018 Ulrike Kusebauch
 2017 Ileana Cristea
 2008 Catherine E. Costello

Clinical & Translational Proteomics Award (since 2014) 

 2022 Connie Jimenez
 2021 Ying Ge
 2018 Peipei Ping
 2015 Jennifer Van Eyk

Science & Technology Award (since 2011) 

 2019 Olga Ornatsky

Distinguished Service Award (since 2004) 

 2015 Catherine E. Costello
 2013 Peipei Ping
 2006 Catherine C. Fenselau

Royal Society of Chemistry 
The Mass Spectrometry Award is the only award of the Royal Societry of Chemistry, which is specifically for the field mass spectrometry.

Mass Spectrometry Award (since 2001) 

 2001 Carol V. Robinson

U.S. Human Proteome Organization 
The major awards of the U.S. Human Proteome Organization are the Donald F. Hunt Distinguished Contribution in Proteomics Award, Catherine E. Costello Lifetime Achievement in Proteomics Award, Gilbert S. Omenn Computational Proteomics Award, and Robert J. Cotter New Investigator Award.

Donald F. Hunt Distinguished Contribution in Proteomics Award (since 2018) 

 2021 Peipei Ping
 2019 Jennifer Van Eyk

Catherine E. Costello Lifetime Achievement in Proteomics Award (since 2019) 

 2022 Catherine C. Fenselau
 2019 Catherine E. Costello

Gilbert S. Omenn Computational Proteomics Award (since 2016) 

 2021 Olga Vitek

Robert J. Cotter New Investigator Award (since 2013) 

 2022 Stephanie M. Cologna
 2020 Si Wu
 2018 Leslie Hicks
 2016 Paola Picotti 
 2014 Judit Villen
 2013 Rebecca Gundry

The Association for Mass Spectrometry and Advances in Clinical Lab 
The major award of the Association for Mass Spectrometry and Advances in Clinical Lab (MSACL) is the MSACL Distinguished Contribution Award.

MSACL Distinguished Contribution Award (since 2015) 

 2022 US Jennifer Van Eyk
 2017 EU Isabelle Fournier
 2017 US Catherine C. Fenselau
 2015 EU Linda Thienpont

Females in Mass Spectrometry 
The major awards of the Females in Mass Spectrometry (FeMS) are the Catherine E. Costello Award and the Indigo BioAutomation FeMS Distinguished Contribution Award.

Catherine E. Costello Award (since 2020) 

 2020 Sarah Brown Riley

Indigo BioAutomation FeMS Distinguished Contribution Award (since 2022) 

 2022 Olga Vitek

References 

Mass spectrometrists